"Cochranella" duidaeana,  commonly known as the Duida Cochran frog, is a species of frog in the family Centrolenidae. It is endemic to Cerro Duida, Venezuela. The generic placement of this species within the subfamily Centroleninae is uncertain (incertae sedis ).

Taxonomy and systematics
This species was originally described as Centrolenella duidaeana. However, most subsequent studies have placed it in the genus Cochranella. A study published in 2002 suggested that it belongs to the Cochranella spinosa group. However, morphological data do not allow unambiguous generic placement. With no molecular data available, it is for the time being retained in Cochranella.

Description
Adult males measure  in snout–vent length; females are unknown. The tympanum is inconspicuous. The dorsum is uniformly green. The iris is greenish-yellowish. Dorsal skin is finely granular.

Habitat and conservation
It occurs in shrubs in montane forest along streams.

There are no known threats to this species. It occurs in the Duida-Marahuaca National Park.

References

Glass frogs
Amphibians of Venezuela
Endemic fauna of Venezuela
Amphibians described in 1992
Taxonomy articles created by Polbot
Taxa named by José Ayarzagüena